Al-Alam is an Arabic news channel broadcasting from Iran and owned by the state-owned media corporation Islamic Republic of Iran Broadcasting (IRIB).

The network's political coverage tends to be the most popular; however, other subjects, such as commentaries, analysis, business and sports also get a share of the audience. Programs are broadcast to over 300 million Arab people around the world, with large audiences in the Persian Gulf and Mediterranean regions. The satellite channel can be received on five continents.

Al-Alam has news bureaus in Tehran, Beirut and Baghdad. Unlike many other channels, it can be viewed in Iraq without the use of a satellite receiver, as it is able to use a terrestrial transmitter close to the Iran-Iraq border.

An English-language website, known as Alalam News, was launched on August 15, 2006, claiming to disseminate news in an impartial, moderate manner.

Alalam News Network launched its Persian website in April 2007 in order to cover news exclusively in the Persian language.

Political alignment 

During latest years, and at the zenith of sensitive periods of global and regional developments, and due to its perception and comprehension of its media message in playing a major and effective role in preserving Islamic countries’ independence and security, Al-Alam news channel dedicated a special interest with this respect. The following are excerpts of those media activities.

War against Saddam Hussein 

In the first hours of US-led forces attack against Iraq, Al-Alam news channel started its coverage of the developments and events in that Muslim country at a noticeable pace; in addition, it dispatched the first pictorial reports about the presence of occupation forces. In view of the fact that international news agencies and mainstream media applauded Al-Alam news channel's presence in Iraq, this media apparatus converted to an essential and main news source for the Iraqi nation. Al-Alam news channel played a transparent and accurate role through presenting programs and news analyses in order to enlighten Iraqi public opinion with regard to the process of forming the government in Baghdad in addition to the negotiation process that led to the signing of st American administration.

33 Day War 

During the thirty-three-day 2006 Lebanon War launched by Israel against Lebanon in response to Hezbollah's arresting of two Israeli soldiers, Al-Alam news channel had a broad coverage of events.

Capturing of British nationals by the Iranian Navy 

On March 30, Al-Alam aired a video of captive Royal Navy personnel. During the 2007 Iranian seizure of Royal Navy personnel al-Alam reported with regard to British soldiers’ confessions about the infringement of Iran's maritime sovereignty, Al-Alam news channel had an important portion in covering that incident. It was the forerunner in transmitting the soldiers’ confessions, and was the main and prime source for media coverage in this respect.

Gaza War 
When the Gaza War started, Al-Alam suspended its ordinary daily programs and focused on reporting from the Gaza strip. It provided speedy coverage from the sites of battle, whilst attempting to present the Iranian view of events.

2011 Bahraini protests 
During the Shiite anti-government protests in Bahrain, the Al-Alam signal was repeatedly jammed. Allegations all point to the fact that Al Mukhabarat Al A'amah, the Saudi Intelligence Agency, was traced back to for evidence of this crime. The jamming attacks were reportedly caused by installations capable of interfering with Al-Alam's frequencies on the Badr satellite from a Saudi transmitter. This act of sabotage and illegal interference with free media has yet to be addressed in an international case.

Geographical coverage 

Al-Alam news channel covers all parts of the globe, with the exception of the southern part of African continent, using the following satellites: Hotbird 8, Eutelsat 7 West A and Galaxy 19. It is also broadcast terrestrially on VHF channel E4 from high ground near the Iraqi border.

Programs

Maal hadath (With the event) 

In this political program daily global developments are discussed and analyzed in the presence of specialized experts or via SNG (satellite news gathering).

Al-Iraq Alyom (Iraq Today) 

This program tends to discuss Iraq's political, social and economic issues in the aftermath of occupation by inviting officials and experts from inside and outside Iraq.

Men Tehran (From Tehran) 

This weekly program spotlights special reports with regard to the most important Iranian issues in the presence of high-ranking renowned local officials, in addition to discussing Iran's political, scientific, cultural and economic developments and their reflections upon international boards.

Al-Mehwar (The Pivot) 

This program is produced by Al-Alam news channel at its studios in the Palestinian occupied territories, in particular Jerusalem, Gaza and Ramallah cities. In this program, leaders of Palestinian groups inside occupied territories exchange views with regard to the main issues and daily developments on the Palestinian domain.

Al-ray Alawal (The Prime Opinion) 

This weekly program discusses the more important issues concern Islamic world where the audience may contribute by their opinions and remarks directly via telephone calls.

Taht Alramad (Under the ashes) 

A strategic regional issue with potentiality of developing to a crisis or a potential political crisis in the foreseeable future is probed in this weekly program. Experts are invited to the program to analyze historical roots and the reasons behind the potential crisis.

Al-hakika ayn (Where is the truth) 

This is a wide-field research for a regional crisis and a thorough investigation to the reasons and factors that exacerbated it, in order to reach the authentic roots for the crisis with the participation of experts at Al-Alam studios in Beirut or via SNG (Satellite News Gathering).

Al-Ain Alisraelia (The Israeli Eye) 

With the political experts’ contribution at Al-Alam studios in Beirut, the latest developments in Israel that are transmitted by Israeli television stations are discussed, probed and analyzed. (cf. Der schwarze Kanal)

Min Al-Kaherah (From Cairo) 

This weekly program highlights the latest political, social and cultural developments in Egypt with contributions from Egyptian experts and analysts.

Walaken naltaki (Face to face) 

This weekly program investigates the spread of a specific social phenomenon in the Islamic world and proposed solutions. Individuals and experts participate in the program.

Horoof (Letters) 

This program presents displays and criticizes the latest political and cultural books in the presence of one of the authors and a renowned critic.

Manber Al-Joma (Friday Tribune) 

This weekly program is presented every Friday; it reflects the most important political excerpts during Friday prayers in some Muslim and Arab countries.

Kathaya Efrikia (African Issues) 

The latest political, social and cultural developments on the African continent are discussed in this weekly program. The program probes and investigates the challenges facing Africa by effective contribution from concerned experts.

Taht Al-Thoa (Limelight) 

The program casts a quick glance on political and social issues in addition to the latest daily global developments through SNG (Satellite News Gathering) with interested experts.

America Waalalam (America and the world) 

This weekly program focuses on domestic and foreign policies of the American administration with concentration on issues related to the Middle East region and the possible impact of those policies upon this strategic region, with direct contribution by experts in US affairs.

Ummah Wahidah (One Ummah) 

In this weekly program, Muslims’ affairs, challenges, and factors causing unity and division among the Islamic ummah, as well as possible solutions, are discussed with two experts in the Islamic nation's affairs.

Controversies
Due to the fact that the channel has linked with the Islamic Republic, it is accused of being an arming channel/tool for the Iranian Government and its propaganda. Critics in the Arab World consider it to have encouraged Shia extremism in the Arab World.

Potential designation as a 'terrorist entity'
On June 26, 2008, the United States House of Representatives has proposed to declare Al-Alam, the English-language Press TV, and several IRIB-affiliated channels as a "Specially Designated Global Terrorist entity" sponsored by Florida congressman Gus Bilirakis. The proposed resolution calls the broadcast of 'incitement to violence' against Americans in Middle Eastern media while Bilirakis claimed that as Iranian state-run TV channels broadcast 'the coverage of rallies and speeches in which Iranian leaders, clerics, children, and mass audience have declared 'Death to America!' due to broadcasting incitement of violence against Americans.

Conviction of correspondents in Israel
On June 14, 2009, a Jerusalem court sentenced a correspondent of Al-Alam, Khodr Shahine, and his assistant, Mohammed Sarhan, to two months imprisonment for reporting on the Israeli land offensive against the Gaza Strip on January 3 prior to the lifting of Israeli military press censorship.

See also

Media of Iran
Al-Ahvaz TV

References

Iran TV channel targets Iraq, article on the BBC website
Iran's leaders harness media power, article on the BBC website

External links
Official website (Arabic)
Official website (English)
Official website (Persian)

Television channels and stations established in 2003
International broadcasters
24-hour television news channels in Iran
Arab mass media
Arabic-language television stations
Islamic Republic of Iran Broadcasting